300 Percent Density is an album by Candiria. Released on May 1, 2001, the album peaked at number 44 on the Billboard Independent Albums chart.

Track listing

Credits 
Writing, performance and production credits are adapted from the album liner notes.

Personnel

Candiria 
 Carley Coma – vocals
 John LaMacchia – guitar
 Eric Matthews – guitar
 Michael MacIvor – bass
 Kenneth Schalk – drums

Production 
 Candiria – production, mixing
 Michael Barile – production, engineering, mixing
 Kenneth Schalk – engineering
 Franci D. – engineering
 Roger Lian – mastering

Visual art 
 Coma Graphics - visual concept
 John LaMacchia – photography
 Kenneth Schalk – photography

Studios 
 Purple Light Studios, New York City, NY, United States – recording, mixing
 Masterdisk, New York City, NY, United States – mastering

Charts

References

External links 
 

2001 albums
Candiria albums